The Palace of Fine Arts is a monumental structure located in the Marina District of San Francisco, California, originally constructed for the 1915 Panama–Pacific International Exposition to exhibit works of art. Completely rebuilt from 1964 to 1974, it is the only structure from the exposition that survives on site.

The most prominent building of the complex, a  open rotunda, is enclosed by a lagoon on one side and adjoins a large, curved exhibition center on the other side, separated from the lagoon by colonnades.  As of 2019, the exhibition center (one of San Francisco's largest single-story buildings) is used as a venue for events such as weddings or trade fairs.

Conceived to evoke a decaying ruin of ancient Rome, the Palace of Fine Arts became one of San Francisco's most recognizable landmarks. Early 2009 marked the completion of a renovation of the lagoons and walkways and a seismic retrofit.

History 

The Palace of Fine Arts was one of ten palaces at the heart of the Panama-Pacific Exhibition. The exhibition also included the exhibit palaces of Education, Liberal Arts, Manufactures, Varied Industries, Agriculture, Food Products, Transportation, Mines, and Metallurgy, and the Palace of Machinery. The Palace of Fine Arts was designed by Bernard Maybeck. He was tasked with creating a building that would serve as a quiet zone where exhibition attendees could pass through between visiting the crowded fairgrounds and viewing the paintings and sculptures displayed in the building behind the rotunda. Maybeck designed what was essentially a fictional ruin from another time. He took his inspiration from Roman and Ancient Greek architecture (specifically Piranesi's etching of the remnants of the so-called Temple of Minerva Medica in Rome), and also from Böcklin's symbolism painting Isle of the Dead.

While most of the exposition was demolished when the exposition ended, the Palace was so beloved that a Palace Preservation League, founded by Phoebe Apperson Hearst, was founded while the fair was still in progress.

For a time the Palace housed a continuous art exhibit, and during the Great Depression, W.P.A. artists were commissioned to replace the decayed Robert Reid murals on the ceiling of the rotunda. From 1934 to 1942 the exhibition hall was home to eighteen lighted tennis courts. During World War II, it was requisitioned by the military for the storage of trucks and jeeps. At the end of the war, when the United Nations was created in San Francisco, limousines used by the world's statesmen came from a motor pool there. From 1947 on, the hall was put to various uses: as a city Park Department warehouse; as a telephone book distribution center; as a flag and tent storage depot; and even as temporary Fire Department headquarters.

While the Palace had been saved from demolition, its structure was not stable. Originally intended to only stand for the duration of the Exhibition, the colonnade and rotunda were not built of durable materials, and thus framed in wood and then covered with staff, a mixture of plaster and burlap-type fiber. As a result of the construction and vandalism, by the 1950s the simulated ruin was a crumbling ruin.

In 1964, the original Palace was completely demolished, with only the steel structure of the exhibit hall left standing. The buildings were then reconstructed until 1974 in permanent, light-weight, poured-in-place concrete, and steel I-beams were hoisted into place for the dome of the rotunda. All the decorations and sculptures were constructed anew. The only changes were the absence of the murals in the dome, two end pylons of the colonnade, and the original ornamentation of the exhibit hall.

In 1969, the former Exhibit Hall became home to the Exploratorium interactive museum, and, in 1970, also became the home of the 966-seat Palace of Fine Arts Theater. In 2003, the City of San Francisco along with the Maybeck Foundation created a public-private partnership to restore the Palace and by 2010 work was done to restore and seismically retrofit the dome, rotunda, colonnades, and lagoon. Within January 2013, the Exploratorium closed in preparation for its permanent move to the Embarcadero.

In 1992 and 1996, the popular U.S. game show Wheel of Fortune taped shows at the Palace for broadcast in November.

In April 2020, during the coronavirus pandemic, plans were announced to convert the Palace of Fine Arts into a temporary shelter for 162 homeless people. The decision was reversed shortly afterward, following protests by residents of the neighboring wealthy Marina neighborhood and concerns that the lodging conditions would be inadequate.

Today, Australian eucalyptus trees fringe the eastern shore of the lagoon. Many forms of wildlife have made their home there including swans, ducks (particularly migrating fowl), geese, turtles, frogs, and raccoons.

Design 

Built around a small artificial lagoon, the Palace of Fine Arts is composed of a wide,  pergola around a central rotunda situated by the water. The lagoon was intended to echo those found in classical settings in Europe, where the expanse of water provides a mirror surface to reflect the grand buildings and an undisturbed vista to appreciate them from a distance.

Ornamentation includes Bruno Zimm's three repeating panels around the entablature of the rotunda, representing “The Struggle for the Beautiful”, symbolizing Greek culture. While Ulric Ellerhusen supplied the weeping women atop the colonnade and the sculptured frieze and allegorical figures representing Contemplation, Wonderment, and Meditation.

The underside of the Palace rotunda's dome features eight large insets, which originally contained murals by Robert Reid. Four depicted the conception and birth of Art, "its commitment to the Earth, its progress and acceptance by the human intellect," and the four "golds" of California (poppies, citrus fruits, metallic gold, and wheat).

In popular culture 
The Palace of Fine Arts has been seen in films such as Vertigo (1958), Time After Time (1979), Bicentennial Man (1999), The Room (2003), and Twisted (2004). It also served as the backdrop for set pieces in So I Married An Axe Murderer (1993) and The Rock (1996). Additionally, the Palace has appeared in the Indian films My Name is Khan (2010) and Vaaranam Aayiram (2008).
It also appears in Season 7, Episode 2 of Mission: Impossible, and in Season 8, Episode 7 of Mannix.  It was incorporated into the imagery of the Sept of Baelor in Season 1, Episode 9 of Game of Thrones.

Lucasfilm headquarters was constructed near the Palace of Fine Arts, which has been noted for its similarity to the city of Theed on Naboo as it appears in the film Star Wars: Episode I – The Phantom Menace (1999).

The structure was also featured as a placeable landmark in the 2003 video game SimCity 4

In the 2000s, a smaller replica of the rotunda of the Palace of Fine Arts was built in Disney's California Adventure in Anaheim, serving as the entrance to a theater showing the film Golden Dreams about the history of California. The attraction closed on September 7, 2008, and was demolished in 2009 to make way for The Little Mermaid ~ Ariel's Undersea Adventure dark ride. The rotunda entrance remained, but it was repainted and serves as an entrance to the ride.

Gallery

See also 

 49-Mile Scenic Drive
 List of San Francisco Designated Landmarks

References

External links 

 SF Rec & Parks.org: Palace of Fine Arts
 The Palace of Fine Arts Information on the website of the "Palace of Fine Arts Theatre"
 Archive.org: Catalogue de luxe of the Department of Fine Arts, Panama-Pacific International Exposition, 1915
 Panoramic slideshow of the grounds

Buildings and structures in San Francisco
Museums in San Francisco
Theatres in San Francisco
Panama–Pacific International Exposition
Historic districts on the National Register of Historic Places in California
San Francisco Designated Landmarks
National Register of Historic Places in San Francisco
Entertainment venues in San Francisco
Folly buildings on the National Register of Historic Places
Rebuilt buildings and structures in the United States
Tourist attractions in San Francisco
World's fair architecture in California
Bernard Maybeck buildings
Beaux-Arts architecture in California
1915 architecture